was a Japanese industrialist who founded Panasonic, the largest Japanese consumer electronics company. Matsushita is referred to as the "God of Management" in Japan.

Childhood

Kōnosuke Matsushita was born on 27 November 1894 in Wakayama Prefecture.  His father was an affluent landlord in the farming village of Wasa (part of present-day Wakayama city) and was one of the wealthiest men of his community.

Teenage years
Shortly after Matsushita left school, he was sent away to Osaka to become an apprentice for a hibachi store. Less than a year into his apprenticeship however, the business failed and Matsushita was left looking for other employment. He then applied for a job with the Osaka Electric Light Company, an electrical utility company. Over the next couple of years, he was promoted several times and his position rose with the company. During this time, Matsushita was introduced to one of his sister's friends, Mumeno Iue, and after a short courtship married her.  Matsushita, now head of a new family, was well aware of his new responsibilities.

At the age of 22, he was promoted to the position of electrical inspector. It was during this time that Matsushita attempted to introduce his boss to the invention of a new and improved light socket that he had perfected in his spare time. His boss, however, was not enthusiastic.

Matsushita Electric Industrial Company

In 1917, Matsushita left Osaka Electric Light Company to set up his own company. Without capital, a formal education, or experience in manufacturing, it would appear the company would fail before it even began. He set up his shop in the basement of his tenement. With his wife, his brother-in-law, and several assistants, he began creating several samples of his product. He attempted to peddle the samples to wholesalers but was unsuccessful because he did not offer more than one product.

Matsushita's assistants left his company and he was left with only his wife and brother-in-law, Toshio Iue, who proved to be a capable salesman and manager. Matsushita would have eventually become bankrupt but he was "saved by an unexpected order for a thousand insulator plates for electric fans." From there, Matsushita was able to continue producing his light sockets. They became popular as wholesalers realized the product was better in quality and less expensive than comparable products in the market. The early years of the company were difficult: he once had to pawn his wife's kimono when he found himself short on money. Matsushita's products were originally marketed under the name brand of "National" and later moved on to the more recognizable names of Panasonic, Quasar and Technics.

One of Matsushita's best products was his invention of a more efficient battery-powered bicycle lamp. During the 1920s, bicycle lamps were candles or oil-burning lamps. They were highly inefficient as they usually only lasted for three hours. He created an oval lamp that used a battery for power and a lightbulb for illumination. He had to personally market his products to retail bicycle shops.

Expansion
Matsushita learned a very important lesson in terms of growing a company while he was trying to introduce his bicycle lamp to wholesalers.  He realized that even if he had a product that was superior to anything out in the market it would not matter if he could not sell the product.  As a result, Matsushita began devising ways to create sales channels for his products by concentrating less on manufacturing and more on building a sales force, which led to a retail store network and finally placed Matsushita's company on the map in Japan's electrical manufacturing and retail industry.

In 1929, he began setting up a new structure for his company.  The company was structured as a parent company and branches of divisions that specialized in a particular product were created. There were three specific products that were being created in Matsushita's company at this time: the bicycle lamp and battery division, the electrical socket division, and the radio division. For each of these products, a national sales department was formed with regional offices established in strategic locations. These regional offices were responsible for the coordination of sales and manufacturing. Products were manufactured based upon the demand for the products. As a result, manufacturing was dependent on sales.

Post-war period
During the US occupation of Japan after World War II, General Douglas MacArthur decided to break up the zaibatsu business conglomerates of Japan. Matsushita was in danger of being removed as president but was saved by a favorable petition signed by 15,000 employees. In 1947, Kōnosuke lent his brother-in-law Toshio to an underused manufacturing plant to manufacture bicycle lamps, a business that eventually became Sanyo Electric.

From 1950 to 1973, Matsushita's company became one of the world's largest manufacturers of electrical goods, sold under well-known trademarks including Panasonic and Technics. Matsushita stepped down as President of Panasonic in 1961 and was succeeded as president by his son-in-law, Masaharu Matsushita. Konosuke Matsushita's two grandsons are Masayuki Matsushita, who is the current vice-chairman of Panasonic, and Hiro Matsushita, who is a former driver in the Champ Car series and owns Swift Engineering, an aerospace firm and race car constructing company which he bought in 1991.

Konosuke Matsushita remained active in Panasonic's operations until his complete retirement in 1973. Since 1954, Matsushita also gained a significant shareholding in manufacturer JVC by forming an alliance. It still retains a 50% share today. In retirement, Matsushita focused on developing and explaining his social and commercial philosophies and wrote 44 published books. One of his books, entitled "Developing A Road To Peace And Happiness Through Prosperity", sold over four million copies.

In 1987, he was awarded the Grand Cordon of the Order of the Paulownia Flowers.

Death
Chronic lung problems led to his death from pneumonia on 27 April 1989, at the age of 94. He died with personal assets worth US$3 billion, and left a company with US$42 billion in revenue business.

Awards and honours

National honour
:
 Grand Cordon of the Order of the Paulownia Flowers (29 April 1987)
 Grand Cordon of the Order of the Rising Sun (29 April 1981)
 Grand Cordon of the Order of the Sacred Treasure
 Recipient of the Medal with Blue Ribbon
 Recipient of the Medal with Dark Blue Ribbon
 Senior Third Rank (27 April 1989; posthumous)

Foreign honour
 :
The Commandeur de L'Ordre de la Couronne Award (1972)
China:
China Reform Friendship Medal (2018)
 :
 Honorary Commander of the Order of the Defender of the Realm (P.M.N.) (1979)

Professorships and Directorships
Konosuke Matsushita was honoured at Stanford University by endowing a Professorship in International Strategy and Management. The official name of the course is The Konosuke Matsushita Professorship in International Strategy and Management

Author of Books 
 Michi wo hiraku (1968) Open the path and often translated as The Path
 Japan at the Brink (1976)
 Thoughts on Man (1982)
 Not for Bread Alone: A Business Ethos, A Management Ethic (1984)
 Quest for Prosperity (1988)
 As I See It (1989)
 Velvet Glove, Iron Fist: And 101 Other Dimensions of Leadership (1991)
 People before Products: The Human Factor in Business (1992)
 The Matsushita Perspective: A Business Philosophy Handbook (1997)
 The Heart of Management: Konosuke Matsushita's Enduring Insights (2002)
My Way of Life and Thinking (2011) (Originally published in 1954)
Practical Management Philosophy (2011) (Originally published in 1978)
Nurturing Dreams – My Path in Life – An Autobiography by the Founder of Panasonic (2014) (Originally published in 1998)

Appears on the cover of 
 Life, Sep-1964, DETAILS: Meet Mr. Matsushita
 Time, 23 February 1962, DETAILS: Industrialist Matsushita

Further reading
 Matsushita Leadership by John Paul Kotter, Simon & Schuster (1998)
 Matsushita Konosuke (1894–1989) His Life & His Legacy: A Collection of Essays in Honor of the Centenary of His Birth by Kōnosuke Matsushita, PHP Research Institute (1994)
 The Matsushita Perspective, A Business Philosophy Handbook, Published by PHP Institute, Inc. (1st ed., 1997).
 Jinsei mondō, dialogue with Daisaku Ikeda published in Chinese (traditional), Chinese (simplified), Korean, and Japanese; Published by Ushio Shuppansha, Tōkyō (1st ed., 1975).
 The Matsushita Phenomenon by Rowland Gould published by the Diamond Publishing Company, Japan (1st edition, 1970).
 The Path, by Konosuke Matsushita, Published by McGraw-Hill (2010)
 Konosuke Matsushita Memorial Foundation

Matsushita family tree

See also

Panasonic
Masaharu Matsushita
Hiroyuki Matsushita
Konosuke Matsushita Museum

References

External links

PHP INTERFACE – PHP Institute, Inc's Official Website

Konosuke Matsushita.com, – Konosuke Matsushita Official Website by PHP Institute, Inc. 
Matsushita Memorial Library – Located in PHP Institute, Inc.'s building in Kyoto, Japan.
The Founder, Konosuke Matsushita by Panasonic
Panasonic Museum – Konosuke Matsushita Museum 
The Matsushita Institute of Government and Management 
 

1894 births
1989 deaths
Japanese billionaires
Japanese inventors
Japanese company founders
Panasonic
People from Wakayama (city)
Recipients of the Order of the Rising Sun with Paulownia Flowers
20th-century Japanese inventors
20th-century Japanese businesspeople
Japanese industrialists
20th-century inventors
20th-century businesspeople
Shintoists
Member of the Mont Pelerin Society